Edward Hogan may refer to:

Edward Hogan (Missouri politician) (1885–1963), American politician
Edward Hogan (New York politician) (1834–1905), American politician
Edward Hogan (writer) (born 1980), British novelist
Edward Hogan, member of Egan's Rats
Edward J. Hogan (1897–1976), American track and field athlete
Ed Hogan (ice hockey) (1882–1953), Canadian ice hockey player

See also
Edmond Hogan (1883–1964), Australian politician
Edmund Hogan (1831–1917), Irish Jesuit scholar